The Ivorian passport is issued to citizens of Ivory Coast for international travel.

Physical properties
 Surname
 Given names
 Nationality Ivorian
 Date of birth 
 Sex  
 Place of birth  
 Date of Expiry 
 Passport number

Languages

The data page/information page is printed in French and English.

See also
 ECOWAS passports
 List of passports
 Visa requirements for Ivorian citizens
 Visa policy of Ivory Coast

References

Côte d'Ivoire
Government of Ivory Coast